Télé Liban (also known as TL) is the first Lebanese public television network, owned by the Lebanese government. It was a result of a merger of the privately run Compagnie Libanaise de Télévision (CLT) (channels 7 and 9) and Télé-Orient (channels 5 and 11). TL is the current Lebanese member of the European Broadcasting Union (EBU).

History

Compagnie Libanaise de Télévision
The Lebanese government granted businessmen Wissam Izzeddine and Alex Moufarrej the first local television license in August 1956, and private Compagnie Libanaise de Télévision (CLT) (in Arabic, شركة التلفزيون اللبنانية). CLT aired programs for the first time on 28 May 1959, making it the first TV station not only in Lebanon but also in the region. The station was officially launched by General Sleiman Nawfal with the aid of France.

Télé-Orient
The station remained Lebanon's only television station until Télé-Orient, full name Television of Lebanon and the Orient (in Arabic تلفزيون لبنان والمشرق) obtained its own license in July 1961 and began operating from Hazmieh. The channel had identical programming on its two broadcasting channels 5 and 11.

The Golden Age
Throughout the 1960s and until the 1970s, Télé Liban provided local, original programming as well as imports from France and the United States. What made Télé Liban unique in the region was its creation of innovative content for a pluralistic country like Lebanon.

The station had two channels, the Arabic channel 7 and mainly French-oriented channel 9 with separate local and French television programming.

During the Civil War
During the Lebanese Civil War, the two private television stations had been taken over by militias, CLT-based channels 7 and 9 located in West Beirut had been dominated by the left wing and Muslim militias and Télé-Orient station channels 5 and 11 located in Hazmieh in the Christian suburbs of East Beirut by right wing Christian militias. Both stations fell into presenting biased coverage according to the parties dominating the station. 

Two unlicenced pirate stations, the right-wing Christian "Lebanese Broadcasting Corporation" (LBC) and the left-wing Muslim "Television of Arab Lebanon" (تلفزيون لبنان العربي) run by the Mourabitoun Muslim Sunni militia were launched challenging the existing stations. 

The newly elected president, Elias Sarkis wanted a unified media outlet to promote his agenda of peace and unity. The two privately owned stations, CLT and Télé Orient, and their subsidiaries agreed to merge in a deal where half the shares were owned by the Lebanese government. The Legislative Decree No. 100 was published in the National Gazette (in Arabic الجريدة الرسمية) on 7 July 1977, making the merger official

The private CLT and Télé-Orient rival stations would later be completely acquired by the Lebanese government and the merged company became a public television station and name changed to Télé Liban.

Post-War Period
When the civil war ended, Télé Liban's monopoly was removed under the 1994 Audiovisual Media Law, and the station found itself for the first time facing tremendous competition. Other television stations with more innovative programming, such as the Lebanese Broadcasting Corporation International, overtook Télé Liban's audience in the 1990s.

Rafic Hariri bought the private sector shares of Télé Liban months before he became prime minister in 1992 and appointed Fouad Naïm as chairman, who quickly revamped the station. However, the government bought back all the shares from the private sector in 1994.

The plethora of private terrestrial and satellite stations available in the Lebanese television market came at the expense of Télé Liban, which since the late 1990s been in continuous decline.

Administration
Initially, Télé Liban was managed by a board composed of twelve directors, six representing the government and six representing TLC and Télé Orient.

The chair of the channel is appointed by the Lebanese cabinet. Jean Claude Boulos and Ibrahim El Khoury (chairman from 1999 to 2013) were former presidents of the channel during the 1990s. from 2014 to 2017 Talal Makdessi was the new temporary president of the channel until a committee from the new Council of Ministers appointed a new board, but currently Télé Liban does not have a Chairman of the Board knowing that after a judicial decision on 26 May 2017, Makdessi was dismissed

See also 
 Lebanese Broadcasting Corporation International
 MTV
 OTV
 NBN

References

External links
 

Television stations in Lebanon
Arabic-language television stations
1959 establishments in Lebanon
Television channels and stations established in 1959
Mass media in Beirut
European Broadcasting Union members